Hanwood is a town in the central Riverina region of New South Wales, Australia. The town is located 5 kilometres south of Griffith, New South Wales and is in the City of Griffith local government area.

Hanwood Post Office opened on 1 January 1921.

Hanwood is known for its wineries, in particular the McWilliam's winery established in 1913. In 1973 the Big Wine Barrel was completed, forming the cellar door tasting rooms. 
They have a wide array of wines, bottles and memorabilia displayed in the 17m long museum.

References

Towns in the Riverina